Ionel Melinte (born 31 January 1996) is a Romanian rugby union football player. He plays as a fullback for professional Le Rugby Club Hyères La Crau Carqueiranne.

Club career
Ionel Melinte started playing rugby as a youth for CS Cleopatra Mamaia at age 16 and after three years he moved to Bucharest to finish his junior years with giants Steaua. After one year he joined the senior squad of Steaua where he played for three seasons. In 2019 he was signed by Timișoara Saracens.

International career
In November 2018, Melinte was called for Romania's national team, the Oaks, being part of the 34 man squad assembled in preparation for a match against the Os Lobos held for the Relegation/Promotion Play-Off of the 2018 Rugby Europe Championship, making his test debut on this occasion.

References

External links

1996 births
Living people
People from Constanța County
Romanian rugby union players
CSA Steaua București (rugby union) players
SCM Rugby Timișoara players
Rugby union fullbacks
Romania international rugby union players